Hélio Coutinho da Silva (2 December 1923 – 12 July 1987) was a Brazilian sprinter. He competed in the men's 100 metres at the 1948 Summer Olympics.

Da Silva died in Rio de Janeiro on 12 July 1987, at the age of 63.

References

External links
 

1923 births
1987 deaths
20th-century Brazilian people
Athletes (track and field) at the 1948 Summer Olympics
Athletes (track and field) at the 1951 Pan American Games
Brazilian male sprinters
Brazilian male triple jumpers
Medalists at the 1951 Pan American Games
Olympic athletes of Brazil
Pan American Games medalists in athletics (track and field)
Pan American Games silver medalists for Brazil